The Journal of Labor Research is a peer-reviewed academic journal which publishes articles regarding labor relations in the United States. Its articles cover the nature of work, labor-management relations, welfare-to-work, flexible employment, labor policy, regulation of labor unions, dispute resolution, and workplace grievance resolution. One issue each year is devoted to emerging topics. The target audience for the journal is  academics, students, employers, and human resources managers.

The Journal of Labor Research was established in 1979 and is published quarterly by the Olin Institute for Employment Policy and Practice at the Department of Economics of George Mason University and by the Locke Institute.

External links

Homepage of the John M. Olin Institute for Employment Practice and Policy, Dept. of Economics, George Mason University

Labour journals
Business and management journals
Quarterly journals
George Mason University
Labor relations in the United States
English-language journals
Publications established in 1979
Springer Science+Business Media academic journals